A list of the films produced in Mexico in 1943 (see 1943 in film):

1943

External links

1943
Films
Lists of 1943 films by country or language